Gavan Francis Disney (27 May 1949 – 6 November 2018) was an Australian television producer.

Career
Disney was best known for being an executive producer of long-running Nine Network variety show Hey Hey It's Saturday and for being co-creator of Network Ten lifestyle program Healthy, Wealthy and Wise. Veteran television personality Bert Newton credits Disney with resurrecting his career in the 1990s by recruiting him to host Network Ten morning show Good Morning Australia.

In 2009, a jury found Disney not guilty of ten counts of indecent assault and two counts of rape, after he was charged in 2008 with assaulting a 17-year-old employee while he was a senior executive at Ballarat television station BTV6 in the 1980s.  The jury had previously been directed by the judge to find Disney not guilty of an additional three counts of indecent assault due to a lack of evidence.

Disney died at the age of 69 in November 2018, following a long illness.

References 

1949 births
2018 deaths
Australian television producers